Aplanocalenia is a genus of lichen-forming fungi in the family Gomphillaceae. This is a monotypic genus, containing the single species Aplanocalenia inconspicua.

References

Ostropales
Lichen genera
Ostropales genera
Taxa named by Antonín Vězda
Taxa named by Emmanuël Sérusiaux
Taxa named by Robert Lücking
Taxa described in 2005